The 1937 AAA Championship Car season consisted of three races, beginning in Speedway, Indiana on May 30 and concluding in Syracuse, New York on September 12.  There were also three non-championship events.  The AAA National Champion and Indianapolis 500 winner was Wilbur Shaw.

Schedule and results

Leading National Championship standings

References

See also
 1937 Indianapolis 500

AAA Championship Car season
AAA Championship Car
1937 in American motorsport